Tatiana Germanovna Novik (born 24 October 1994) is a Russian pair skater. With Andrei Novoselov, she is the 2012 Toruń Cup champion. With Mikhail Kuznetsov, she placed fourth at the 2010 World Junior Championships and took bronze at the 2010 International Cup of Nice.

Career
Novik teamed up with Mikhail Kuznetsov in spring 2009. They won the silver medal at the 2010 Russian Junior Championships and placed 4th at the 2010 World Junior Championships. They were coached by Nina Mozer in Moscow and split at the end of the 2010–11 season.

Later in 2011, Novik began skating with Andrei Novoselov. They placed fourth at the 2011 Ice Challenge and eighth at the 2012 Russian Championships before winning the 2012 Toruń Cup. The pair entered the 2013 Nebelhorn Trophy, intending to represent Romania, but did not compete at the event.

Programs
(with Kuznetsov)

Competitive highlights

With Novoselov

With Kuznetsov

References

External links 

 
 

Russian female pair skaters
1994 births
Living people
Figure skaters from Moscow